Melinda Patyi is a Hungarian sprint canoer who has competed since the early 2000s. She won three medals at the ICF Canoe Sprint World Championships with a two golds (K-2 200 m: 2003, K-4 200 m: 2006) and a silver (K-4 200 m: 2007).

References

Hungarian female canoeists
Living people
Year of birth missing (living people)
ICF Canoe Sprint World Championships medalists in kayak